Phaonia cincta is a species of fly which is widely distribution across the Palaearctic.

References

Muscidae
Diptera of Europe
Insects described in 1846
Taxa named by Johan Wilhelm Zetterstedt